The Brown County State Bank is a bank in Brown County, Illinois. It was founded in 1901.

External links
Brown County State Bank website

Banks established in 1901
1901 establishments in Illinois
Companies based in Brown County, Illinois
Banks based in Illinois